Chénérailles is a commune in the Creuse department in central France.

Geography
A small town situated at the junction of the D997, D4, D7 and D55 roads, 12 miles to the north of Aubusson, on a hill dominating marshy areas from which rises a tributary of the Voueize.

History

Originally a fortified stronghold going back to before Roman times, there's plenty of evidence found of Roman occupation too (urns, papyrus ashes, coins and medallions of the emperors Maximilian, Gallien, Gordien and Licinius). The city was once surrounded by a strong wall, in the middle of which there was a castle (since destroyed). These days, the site is occupied by the parish church of St Barthélémy.
Chénérailles suffered from the wars against the English early in the 15th century, being almost completely destroyed, but Jacques and Bernard of Armagnac, Comtes de la Marche, rebuilt the place between the years 1430 and 1440.  The first of these Counts, Jacques, re-confirmed several privileges that had been granted to Chénérailles, in 1265, by Hugues XII of Lusignan.  In 1592, towards the end of the French Wars of Religion, the city supported the Catholic League and was besieged for 8 months, only surrendering when they were starved out.

Population

Sights
 St. Barthélemy church, dating from the thirteenth century.
 The nineteenth century chapel of Notre-Dame.
 The ancient ramparts.

See also
 Communes of the Creuse département

References

Communes of Creuse